Jens Ackermann (born 2 July 1975 in Magdeburg) is a German politician and member of the FDP in the Bundestag.

External links 
 Bundestag biography 

1975 births
Living people
Politicians from Magdeburg
Martin Luther University of Halle-Wittenberg alumni
Members of the Bundestag for Saxony-Anhalt
Members of the Bundestag 2009–2013
Members of the Bundestag 2005–2009
Members of the Bundestag for the Free Democratic Party (Germany)